Phultala is an upazila of Khulna District in the Division of Khulna, Bangladesh.

Geography
It has 12867 households and total area 56.83 km2.

Demographics
As of the 1991 Bangladesh census, Phultala has a population of 67930. Males constitute 51.01% of the population, and females 48.99%. This Upazila's eighteen up population is 36368. Phultala has an average literacy rate of 41.1% (7+ years), and the national average of 32.4% literate.

Administration
Phultala Upazila is divided into four union parishads: Atra Gilatala, Damodar, Jamira, and Phultala. The union parishads are subdivided into 18 mauzas and 29 villages.

See also
 Upazilas of Bangladesh
 Districts of Bangladesh
 Divisions of Bangladesh

References

Upazilas of Khulna District
Khulna Division